Ticinese is the adjective form of Ticino and can refer to:
Something of or related to Ticino
Ticinese dialect
Something related to the Ticino river
Porta Ticinese Quartiere of Milan taking the name from the Gate of the medieval walls of Milan